Gašper Mašek or Kašpar Mašek (6 January 1794 – 13 May 1873) was a Czech-Slovenian composer.

The son of Vincenc Mašek (1755–1831), he was born and spent his early life in Prague, where he also studied. He then made a career as a composer for the theater in Graz and Slovenia. He composed operas, operettas, church music, and cantatas. Among his works are the patriotic Slovenian Overture (1870). He died in Ljubljana.  His son Kamilo Mašek (1831–1859) was also a composer.

References
Simpson/Peskova, "Kašpar Mašek". The New Grove Dictionary of Music and Musicians. London: Macmillan, 2001.

Notes

1794 births
1873 deaths
Czech male classical composers
Musicians from Prague
Czech Romantic composers
Slovenian classical composers
Slovenian male musicians
Male classical composers
Slovenian people of Czech descent
19th-century classical composers
19th-century Czech male musicians